Running Press is an American publishing company and member of the Perseus Books Group, a division of the Hachette Book Group. The publisher's offices are located in Philadelphia, Pennsylvania, with many of the corporate functions taking place in Hachette's New York City headquarters. It was co-founded by Stuart "Buz" Teacher and his brother,  Lawrence "Larry" Teacher, who died in March 2014.

Black Dog & Leventhal Publishers became an imprint of Running Press in 2017.

Select bibliography
 Running Press Miniature Editions, 2" by 3" hardcover books (many of them abridgements of bestsellers and often sold as impulse or gift purchases at checkout counters)
 Sneaky Chef cookbook series by Missy Chase Lapine
 Images coloring book series, by Roger Burrows
 Wisdom to Grow On, Charles J. Acquisto (2006)
 The Mammoth Book of Best New Manga, ILYA (2006)
 Cathy's Book, Sean Stewart and  Jordan Weisman (2006)
 The Way of the Wiseguy, Joseph D. Pistone (2004)
 The Real Mad Men: The Renegades of Madison Avenue and the Golden Age of Advertising, Andrew Cracknell
 Michael Jackson's complete guide to Single Malt Scotch, Michael Jackson. 
 Skinny Bitch, Rory Freedman and Kim Barnouin (2005)
 Fabulicious!: Teresa's Italian Family Cookbook, Teresa Giudice (2010)
 Seventeen's Ultimate Style Guide, Ann Shoket and the Editors of Seventeen (2011)
 Dumbemployed, Phil Edwards and Matt Kraft (2011)
 Seven Wonders, Ben Mezrich (2014)

In 2012, Comedy Central contracted to create a publishing imprint with Running Press, including books by Denis Leary and Tosh.0.

References

External links
Official website
 Finding aid to the Running Press records at the University of Pennsylvania Libraries

 
Book publishing companies based in Pennsylvania
Companies based in Philadelphia
Publishing companies established in 1972